Robert Porter Keep (April 26, 1844 – June 3, 1904) was an American scholar.

He was born in Farmington, Connecticut. He graduated from Yale University in 1865, was instructor there for two years, was United States consul at Piraeus in Greece from 1869 to 1871, taught Greek in Williston Seminary, Easthampton, Massachusetts, from 1876 to 1885, and was principal of Norwich Free Academy, Norwich, Connecticut, from 1885 to 1903, the school owing its prosperity to him hardly less than to its founders. In 1903 he took charge of Miss Porter's School for Girls at Farmington, Connecticut, founded in 1844 and long controlled by his aunt, Sarah Porter. He died in Farmington.

References

External links
 

1844 births
1904 deaths
People from Farmington, Connecticut
Yale University alumni